Kim Hyok-bong (born 28 October 1985) is a retired North Korean table tennis player representing the April 25 Sports Team. He competed at the 2008 and 2012 Summer Olympics. At the 2012 Summer Olympics he reached the fourth round, knocking out seeded South Korean Joo Se-hyuk in the third round. He won gold medals in mixed doubles events with Kim Jong at the 2013 World Championships and the 2014 Asian Games. The World Championship gold was the first for DPR Korea since 1977.

References

External links
 

1985 births
Living people
North Korean male table tennis players
Table tennis players at the 2008 Summer Olympics
Table tennis players at the 2012 Summer Olympics
Olympic table tennis players of North Korea
Asian Games medalists in table tennis
Table tennis players at the 2010 Asian Games
Table tennis players at the 2014 Asian Games
Asian Games gold medalists for North Korea
Asian Games bronze medalists for North Korea
Medalists at the 2010 Asian Games
Medalists at the 2014 Asian Games
World Table Tennis Championships medalists
21st-century North Korean people